Kheireddine Boussouf (born 12 December 1987) is an Algerian footballer who plays for Paradou AC in the Algerian Ligue Professionnelle 1.

References 

Living people
1987 births
Algerian footballers
Algerian expatriate footballers
Algerian Ligue Professionnelle 1 players
Algerian Ligue 2 players
Saudi First Division League players
CRB Aïn Fakroun players
JS Saoura players
Olympique de Médéa players
NA Hussein Dey players
MC Alger players
Al-Tai FC players
Expatriate footballers in Saudi Arabia
Algerian expatriate sportspeople in Saudi Arabia
Association football goalkeepers
21st-century Algerian people